Lung tumors are  neoplastic lung nodules. These include:

Primary tumors of the lung/pulmonary system:
 Bronchial leiomyoma, a rare, benign tumor
 Lung cancer, the term commonly used to refer to carcinoma of the lung
 Pulmonary carcinoid tumor
 Pleuropulmonary blastoma
 Neuroendocrine tumors of the lung
 Lymphomas of the lung.
 Sarcomas of the lung.
 Some rare vascular tumors of the lung

Non-lung tumors which may grow into the lungs:
 Mediastinal tumors
 Pleural tumors

Metastasis or secondary tumors/neoplasms with other origin:
 Metastasis to the lung

See also
 Lung nodule

References